Armenian Dances is a musical piece for concert band, written by Alfred Reed (1921–2005). It is a four-movement suite of which Part I comprises the first movement and Part II comprises the remaining three.  Each part consists of a number of Armenian folk songs from the collection of Komitas Vardapet (1869–1935), an Armenian ethnomusicologist.

Part I 

Armenian Dances (Part I) was completed in the summer of 1972 and first performed by the University of Illinois Symphonic Band on January 10, 1973.  The piece is dedicated to Dr. Harry Begian, the director of that ensemble.  The work includes five distinct sections:
 Tzirani Tzar (The Apricot Tree) (mm. 1–29) (Broadly, and sustained), which opens the piece, begins with a short brass fanfare and runs in the woodwinds.  This sentimental song consists of three related melodies.
 Gakavi Yerk (The Partridge's Song) (mm. 30–68) (Con moto), an original composition by Vardapet in common time, has a simple melody which is first stated in the woodwinds and then repeated by the brass. Its simple, delicate melody was intended for a children's choir and is symbolic of that bird's tiny steps.
 Hoy, Nazan Eem (Hoy, My Nazan) (mm. 69–185) (Allegretto non troppo) is a lively dance, mostly in 5/8 time, which naturally imposes an unusual pattern of additive meter—the notes repeatedly change from 3+2 eighth notes per bar to 2+3 eighth notes per bar. In this song, a young man sings the praises of his beloved, named Nazan.
 Alagyaz (mm. 186–223) (Broadly, with expression), a folk song named for a mountain in Armenia, is a broad and majestic song in 3/4 time; it serves as a contrast to the fast, upbeat songs that come both before and after.
 Gna, Gna (Go, Go) (mm. 224–422) (Allegro vivo con fuoco) is a very fast, delightful, and humorous laughing-song in 2/4 time; it builds in volume and speed until the exciting conclusion of the piece.

Part II 

Armenian Dances (Part II) was again dedicated to Dr. Harry Begian, and was premiered on April 4, 1976, in Urbana, Illinois, by the University of Illinois Symphonic Band, Dr. Begian conducting.  Part II consists of three movements, each based upon a single Armenian folk song.
 Hov Arek (The Peasant's Plea) (Slowly, and very sustained) A lyrical song in which a young man implores the mountains to send a breeze to rid him of his woes.  It is a deeply moving song in which the delicate melodic line encompasses a wide range of expression.  Hov Arek means "come, breeze;" however, on the score Dr. Reed put the translation as "The Peasant's Plea."
 Khoomar (Wedding Dance) (Allegretto scherzando) A female Armenian name.  It was originally arranged for soprano with mixed chorus by Gomidas Vartabed.  In this energetic, light-hearted  dance song, a joyous Armenian village scene is depicted in which two young people meet and marry.  This song is characterized by its vital rhythmic patterns.  Dr. Reed subtitled this movement as "Wedding Dance."
 Lorva Horovel (Songs from Lori) (Broadly) The original music has a complex improvisational melody which was extensively researched by Vartabed.  In its rich rhythmic and melodic structure, it reveals elements dating back to Pre-Christian times.  The song is connected with the farmer and his physical and spiritual being during his work.  It is the immediate result of his labor, with his pleas to the oxen and his exclamations while plowing.  These expressions resound throughout the free flowing melody, rhythmic and intervallic structure of this beautiful song.  It is a plow song from the district of Lori, and Dr. Reed subtitled it "Songs from Lori."

References 
 Program Note by Alfred Reed, from the scores to Armenian Dances (Part I) and Part II
 Historical Note by Dr. Violet Vagramian, Florida International University, from the scores to Armenian Dances (Part I) and Part II

Armenian music
Compositions by Alfred Reed
Concert band pieces
Suites (music)